Phoxinellus is a genus of cyprinid fishes found in the Balkans.  There are currently three described species in this genus.

Species 
 Phoxinellus alepidotus Heckel, 1843
 Phoxinellus dalmaticus Zupančič & Bogutskaya, 2000
 Phoxinellus pseudalepidotus Bogutskaya & Zupančič, 2003

References 
 

 
Fish of Europe
Taxonomy articles created by Polbot